The 1974 PGA Tour season was played from January 3 to November 3. The season consisted of 44 official money events. Johnny Miller won the most tournaments, eight, including the first three events. There were 10 first-time winners. The tournament results and award winners are listed below.

Schedule
The following table lists official events during the 1974 season.

Unofficial events
The following events were sanctioned by the PGA Tour, but did not carry official money, nor were wins official.

Awards

Notes

References

External links
PGA Tour official site

PGA Tour seasons
PGA Tour